Sanbao taijian xiyang ji, also translated into English as The Eunuch Sanbao's Voyage to the Western Ocean or The Journey of Sanbao the Eunuch to the Western Ocean, is a classic Chinese novel written by Luo Maodeng (羅懋登) in the late 16th-century during the Ming dynasty.  It consist of 100 chapters and is set in the early 15th-century. The novel is about the voyages of admiral Zheng He.  However, instead of a realistic chronicle of Zheng He's journeys, the novel is a blend of "factual" and "fantastic narrative" akin in style to the shenmo novels of the same period.

Citations 

Chinese classic novels
16th-century Chinese novels
Ming dynasty novels